In a Corner of Spain (Spanish: En un rincón de España) is a 1949 Spanish drama film directed by Jerónimo Mihura and starring Carlos Agostí, Juan de Landa and Blanca de Silos. It was the first Spanish film in colour, using the cinefotocolor process. Part of the narrative portrays the lives of Polish political refugees who have settled in Spain.

Cast
 Carlos Agostí as Pablo 
 José Bruguera as Padre Luis  
 Jesús Castro Blanco as Médico  
 Arturo Cámara as Comisario  
 Juan de Landa as Alcalde  
 Blanca de Silos as Lida Kluber 
 Osvaldo Genazzani as Stanis Kluber  
 José Isbert as Tío Tomás, el pescador  
 María Martín as Rosa María  
 Adriano Rimoldi as Vladimir  
 Conrado San Martín as Ian Eminowicz  
 Aníbal Vela as Juan Carlos
 Bartolomé Planas  
 Manuel Requena 
 Juan Manuel Soriano

References

Bibliography
 Bentley, Bernard. A Companion to Spanish Cinema. Boydell & Brewer 2008.

External links 

1949 films
Spanish drama films
1949 drama films
1940s Spanish-language films
Films directed by Jerónimo Mihura
1940s Spanish films